Jessopp is a surname. Notable people with the surname include:

 Anne Jessopp (born 1963), chief executive of Royal Mint
 Augustus Jessopp (1823–1914), English cleric and writer
 Neville Jessopp (1898–1977), English cricketer

See also
 Jessop